Glendale Technology High School is a government-funded co-educational comprehensive secondary day school, located in , a suburb of Lake Macquarie, in the Hunter region of New South Wales, Australia.

Established in 1970 as Glendale High School, the school enrolled approximately 780 students in 2018, from Year 7 to Year 12, of whom 14 percent identified as Indigenous Australians and five percent were from a language background other than English. The school is operated by the NSW Department of Education; the principal is Anthony Angel.

Overview 
Glendale High School became a Technology High School in 1990. The Glendale Industry Academy, training students in skills shortage areas, is delivered at the school in partnership with TAFE NSW and local industries.

Broadcaster, comedian and writer John Doyle taught at the school in the 1980s.

See also 

 List of government schools in New South Wales
 Education in Australia

References

External links
 
 NSW Schools website

Public high schools in New South Wales
City of Lake Macquarie
1970 establishments in Australia
Educational institutions established in 1970